BC Brno history and statistics in FIBA Europe and Euroleague Basketball (company) competitions.

European competitions

Worldwide competitions

Record
BC Brno has overall, from 1958–59 (first participation) to 2006–07 (last participation): 85 wins against 93 defeats in 178 games for all the European club competitions.

 EuroLeague: 48–45 (93)
 FIBA Saporta Cup: 22–25 (47)
 FIBA Korać Cup: 5–9 (14)
 FIBA EuroCup Challenge: 10–14 (24)

See also
 Czechoslovak basketball clubs in European competitions

External links
FIBA Europe
Euroleague
ULEB
Eurocup

Sport in Brno
Basketball teams in the Czech Republic